R321 road may refer to:
 R321 road (Ireland)
 R321 road (South Africa)